Jammyland Records was an independent music retailer in New York City. It opened in 1993 at its location on 60 E 3rd Street in Manhattan, by owner Ira Heaps. The store specialized in Jamaican music, specifically the ska, rocksteady and reggae genres of the 60s and 70s recorded on vinyl, though  it also sold CDs. Jammyland also reissued more obscure reggae. The store used to have a recording studio in its basement, where artists including Victor Rice, The Slackers and the Dynamos recorded, but later an avant-garde/noise music retailer opened in the basement.

As well as from its storefront, Jammyland also sold records on eBay.

As of June 1, 2008, Jammyland @ 60 East 3rd Street location has been closed.

Jammyland All-Stars 
Visiting Jamaican artists such as Glen Adams, B.B. Seaton, Glen Brown, Sammy Dread, Ranking Joe, Cornell Campbell, Milton Henry and Congo Ashanti Roy of The Congos are sometimes backed by a collective of musicians under the name Jammyland All-Stars. The band includes the store's owner, Ira Heaps, on bass guitar.

Other Musicians Include:
Eddie Ocampo - Drums, Brett Tubin - Rhythm Guitar, Justin Rothberg - Lead Guitar, Benny Herson - Drums

External links

Jammyland on MySpace 
Jammyland is jammed article in The Villager
Jammyland's page on StylusCity

Music retailers of the United States
Companies based in New York City